Hale v. Kentucky, 303 U.S. 613 (1938), was a  United States Supreme Court case relating to racial discrimination in the selection of juries for criminal trials. The case overturned the conviction of an African American man accused of murder because the lower court of Kentucky had systematically excluded African Americans from serving on the jury in the case. NAACP counsel, including Charles H. Houston, Leon A. Ransom and Thurgood Marshall, represented Hale.

Background
Joe Hale, an African American, had been convicted in McCracken County, Kentucky. No African Americans were selected as jury members within the previous 50 years although nearly 7,000 were eligible for jury service.

Opinion of the Court
The court unanimously ruled that the plaintiff's civil rights had been violated.

Impact
Hale v. Kentucky was one in a series of cases where the Supreme Court overturned convictions of blacks for reason of discrimination in jury selections in the lower courts.

See also
List of United States Supreme Court cases, volume 303
Norris v. Alabama (1935)
Hollins v. Oklahoma (1935)
NAACP in Kentucky

References

Further reading

 See a picture of the NAACP Legal Team 1933 including Ransom, professor at the Howard Law School, at "A Century of Racial Segregation, 1849-1950" in the Library of Congress exhibition, "With an Even Hand": Brown v. Board at Fifty. Accessed December 29, 2010. www.loc.gov/exhibits/brown/brown-segregation.html.

External links

 

United States Supreme Court cases
United States Supreme Court cases of the Hughes Court
United States equal protection and criminal procedure case law
1938 in United States case law
Civil rights movement case law
United States racial discrimination case law